The Prieto River is a river in Lares, Puerto Rico.

History
During the Spanish-American War (1898), a number of Spanish soldiers drowned in this river:

See also

 List of rivers of Puerto Rico

References

External links

 USGS Hydrologic Unit Map – Caribbean Region (1974)
 Ríos de Puerto Rico 

Rivers of Puerto Rico